Sergeevskaret is a mountain pass in Sørkapp Land at Spitsbergen, Svalbard. It separates Sergeevfjellet from Lidfjellet to the south. Sergeevskaret is named after A. M. Sergeev, participant in the Swedish-Russian Arc-of-Meridian Expedition.

References

Mountain passes of Svalbard